Empire of Ash III is a post-apocalyptic science fiction movie from 1989. It is a sequel to the movie known as Empire of Ash or Empire of Ash II. The film is also known as Maniac Warriors  and Last Of The Warriors.

Plot
In 2050, sometime after a nuclear war, much of the ruling elite has succumbed to a disease that requires a transfusion of blood. Bands of militaristic, government-sanctioned band of nomads called the Warriors, led by the Baalca, forcibly use needles to extract healthy blood from unwilling females and deliver it to the rulers. Zak (Andrew MacGregor) and Iodine (Joe Maffei) are regarded as a subversive threat to the blood bank troops. Danielle (Melanie Kilgour) rescues loner Lucas (William Smith), who later returns the favor and assists her in assembling a group for her sister's rescue as they try to stop the blood harvesting.

Cast

William Smith as  Lucas
Ken Farmer as Chuck
Melanie Kilgour as  Danielle
Scott Anderson as Harris
Nancy Pataki as Baacla
Tanya Orton as Claudia
Joe Maffei as Iodine
Andrew MacGregor as Zak
Serge Houde as 2nd Shepherd
Tim Chapman as Raider

Reception
John Stanley in Creature Feature (2000) called this the worst movie of the post-apocalyptic genre. TV Guide also found the movie lacking, stating that it was "badly in need of a transfusion of talent."

References

External links
 
List of apocalyptic and post-apocalyptic fiction

1989 films
1980s science fiction films
Canadian sequel films
English-language Canadian films
Canadian post-apocalyptic films
Films set in the future
Canadian science fiction films
1980s English-language films
1980s Canadian films